Seven Days is the fourth extended play by Canadian recording artist PartyNextDoor. It was released on September 28, 2017, by OVO Sound and Warner Records. The EP features two guest appearances from Halsey and Rick Ross.

Background
The concept of the EP was detailed during an interview with Zane Lowe. The EP was made in just seven days, according to PartyNextDoor. The tracklist was teased with individual tracks, with the last track premiering on Beats 1 Radio.

Track listing

Personnel

Performers
 PartyNextDoor – primary artist
 Halsey – featured artist 
 Rick Ross – featured artist 
	
Technical
 David Hughes – recording engineer 
 Chris Athens – mastering engineer 
 Dave Huffman – mastering engineer 
 Jaycen Joshua – mixing engineer 
 Ben Milchev – assistant mixing engineer 
 David Nakaji – assistant mixing engineer 

Production
 PartyNextDoor – producer 
 Cardiak – producer 
 Dez Wright – producer 
 Frank Dukes – producer 
 T-Minus – producer 
 G. Ry – producer 
 Prep Bijan – producer 
 Cassius Jay – producer 
 Andrew Watt – producer 
 Bijan Amir – producer 
 M.simp – producer

Charts

References

2017 EPs
Albums produced by PartyNextDoor
Albums produced by Frank Dukes
Albums produced by T-Minus (record producer)
OVO Sound EPs
Warner Records EPs
PartyNextDoor albums